Pierre Jean Louis Germain Soulages (24 December 1919 – 25 October 2022) was a French painter, printmaker, and sculptor. In 2014, President François Hollande of France described him as "the world's greatest living artist." His works are held by leading museums of the world, and there is a museum dedicated to his art in his hometown of Rodez.

Soulages is known as "the painter of black", owing to his interest in the colour "both as a colour and a non-colour. When light is reflected on black, it transforms and transmutes it. It opens a mental field all its own." He saw light as a work material; striations of the black surface of his paintings enable him to reflect light, allowing the black to come out of darkness and into brightness, thus becoming a luminous colour.

Soulages produced 104 stained-glass windows for the Romanesque architecture of the Abbey Church of Sainte-Foy in Conques from 1987 to 1994. He received international awards, and the Louvre in Paris held a retrospective of his works on the occasion of his centenary.

Early life and family
Soulages was born in Rodez, Aveyron, on 24 December 1919. His father, Amans, was a carriage maker who ran a hunting and fishing shop. He died when Pierre was age five. Pierre was raised by his older sister Antoinette and their mother, Aglaé Zoé Julie (Corp) Soulages. As a child, he was interested in the area's menhirs, in Celtic carvings in the local museum, and also in the Romanesque architecture of the Abbey Church of Sainte-Foy in Conques. He dressed in all black, and his mother disliked it.

Early career
Inspired by the art of Paul Cézanne and Pablo Picasso, Soulages began studies at the École nationale supérieure des beaux-arts in Paris, but soon dropped out because he was disappointed by the traditional style.

After wartime military service, he studied further at the Fine Arts School of Montpellier. He opened a studio in Courbevoie, Paris, painting in "complete abstraction", with black as the dominant colour, and experimenting with walnut oil. His first exhibition was at the Salon des Indépendants in 1947. He also worked as a designer of stage sets. He exhibited at the Venice Biennale in 1954, and in New York City the same year, gaining recognition in the United States. Betty Parsons Gallery showed his work in New York in 1949. In 1950, Leo Castelli organized an exhibition at Sidney Janis.  In 1954 Soulages began showing at Samuel Kootz.  His works were included in the two major exhibitions of European artists, Younger European Painters at the Solomon R Guggenheim Museum (1953) and The New Decade: 22 European Painters and Sculptors at the Museum of Modern Art (1955) in New York. In 1979, Soulages was made a Foreign Honorary Member of the American Academy of Arts and Letters.

Later career
From 1987 to 1994, he produced 104 stained-glass windows for the Abbey of Sainte-Foy in Conques, prepared by around 700 tests at a small factory near Münster, Germany. A gallerist reflected the windows in the context of his paintings:

Soulages was the first living artist to have been invited to exhibit at the state Hermitage Museum of St. Petersburg and later with the Tretyakov Gallery of Moscow (2001).

In 2007, the Musée Fabre of Montpellier devoted an entire room to Soulages, presenting a donation he made to the city. It included twenty paintings dating from 1951 to 2006, among which were major works from the 1960s, two large "plus-black" works from the 1970s, and several large polyptychs. A retrospective was held at the Centre National d'Art et de Culture Georges Pompidou from October 2009 to March 2010. In 2010, the Museum of Mexico City presented a retrospective of paintings that also included an interview-video with the artist.

In 2014, the Musée Soulages opened in Soulages' hometown of Rodez, as a place to permanently display his works and to house temporary contemporary exhibitions. Soulages and his wife donated 900 works.  The paintings represent all stages of his work, from post-war oils to a phase of work he calls Outrenoir.  It was the most complete display of work from his first 30 years. Some space in the museum is always reserved for exhibitions of other contemoprary artists, as Soulages had wanted from the beginning.

In 2014, Soulages presented fourteen recent works in his first American exhibition in 10 years, at Dominique Lévy and Galerie Perrotin, New York. In September 2019, the Lévy Gorvy Gallery in New York held a major exhibition ahead of the retrospective at the Louvre Museum in December celebrating his 100th birthday.

On 17 November 2021, his Peinture 195 x 130 cm, 4 août 1961, was auctioned for $20.2M, an auction record for the artist.

Artistic practice

Soulages said, "My instrument is not black but the light reflected from the black."  Naming his own practice Outrenoir, (Beyond Black) the paintings he produces are known for their endless black depth, created by playing with the light reflected off of the texture of the paint.  Knowing that he needed a new term to define the way that he worked, Soulages invented 'Outrenoir' to define his practice.  Not having a translation into English, the closest meaning is 'beyond black'; in a 2014 interview he explained the definition of the term, "Outrenoir doesn't exist in English; the closest is "beyond black." In French, you say "outre-Manche," "beyond the Channel," to mean England or "outre-Rhin," "beyond the Rhine," to mean Germany. In other words, "beyond black" is a different country from black."

The infatuation Soulages had with black began long before his investigations with 'Outrenoir' at the age of 60.  Initially inspired by his interest in the prehistoric  and his want of retreating to something more pure, primal and deliberately stripped of any other connotations, he says of his fascination with the colour, "during thousands of years, men went underground, in the absolute black of grottoes, to paint with black." "I made these because I found that the light reflected by the black surface elicits certain emotions in me. These aren't monochromes. The fact that light can come from the colour which is supposedly the absence of light is already quite moving, and it is interesting to see how this happens."

Applying the paint in thick layers, Soulages' painting technique includes using objects such as spoons, tiny rakes and bits of rubber to work away at the painting, often making scraping, digging or etching movements depending on whether he wants to evoke a smooth or rough surface. The texture that is then produced either absorbs or rejects light, breaking up the surface of the painting by disrupting the uniformity of the black.  He often used bold cuts in vertical and horizontal lines, the crevasses and forms created by using angles and contours. In his recent work from 2013 to 2014, Soulages began to explicitly vary the pigment used in the paint, mixing matte and glossy types of black as well as hardened densities of black pigment. Preferring to suspend the paintings like walls, he uses wires to hang them in the middle of the room, "I always liked paintings to be walls rather than windows. When we see a painting on a wall, it's a window, so I often put my paintings in the middle of the space to make a wall. A window looks outside, but a painting should do the opposite—it should look inside of us".

Instead of having titles, Soulages paintings are uniformly named as "Peinture" (: Painting), followed by size and date of production. 17 December 1966 from 1966, in the collection of the Honolulu Museum of Art demonstrates the artist's boldly brushed black on white canvases. His works had to be hung without frames in exhibitions.

Personal life
While at the Fine Arts School of Montpellier, Soulages met Colette Llaurens (born 1920). They were married on 24 October 1942. The couple had no children. In 2017, they permanently moved to their summer retreat in Sète.

Soulages died in Nîmes on 25 October 2022, at age 102, and was survived by his wife of 80 years.

Collections 
Collections of works by Soulages are held by many museums, including:
 Centre Georges Pompidou (Paris)
 Honolulu Museum of Art
 Montreal Museum of Fine Arts
 Musée d'Art Moderne de la Ville de Paris 
 Musée Soulages (Rodez)
 Museum of Modern Art (New York) 
 Museum of Modern Art  (Rio de Janeiro)
 National Gallery of Art (Washington, D.C.)
 Solomon R. Guggenheim Museum (New York)
 Tate Gallery (London)

Publications and monographs 
Exhibitions of art by Soulages were accompanied by publications including:

Honours and awards 
Awards that Soulages received included:
 Carnegie Prize (United States, 1964)
 Grand Prix for Painting (Paris, 1975)
 Rembrandt Award (Germany, 1976)
 Foreign Honorary Member of the American Academy of Arts and Letters (1979)
 Grand prix national de peinture (France, 1986)
 Praemium Imperiale for painting (Japan, 1992)
 Austrian Decoration for Science and Art (2006)
 Prix Julio González (Valencia, 2006)
 Grand Cross of the Legion of Honour (Paris, 2015)
 Grand prix du rayonnement français (France, 2019)

References

External links

 Official web site
 New Soulages museum opens in Rodez
 Biography, pictures at Galerie Birch
 Musée Soulages
 Atelier JD Fleury
 Centre Pompidou Virtuel | Espace Presse
 Pierre Soulages – Blues

 

1919 births
2022 deaths
Abstract painters
People from Rodez
Art Informel and Tachisme painters
20th-century French painters
20th-century French male artists
French male painters
21st-century French painters
21st-century French male artists
School of Paris
Grand Croix of the Légion d'honneur
Recipients of the Austrian Decoration for Science and Art
Members of the American Academy of Arts and Letters
Recipients of the Praemium Imperiale
20th-century French sculptors
French male sculptors
French centenarians
Men centenarians
French military personnel of World War II
French abstract artists